Henrietta Maria Stanley, 4th Baroness Strange (1687 – 26 June 1718) was an English peer.

Henrietta was born in 1687, the daughter of the 9th Earl of Derby. He died in 1709 and one of his titles, Baron Strange, fell into abeyance between Lady Henrietta and her younger sister Lady Elizabeth. On Lady Elizabeth's death in 1714 Henrietta became the sole heir and succeeded to the title.

On 21 May 1706, she married the 4th Earl of Anglesey and so became the Countess of Anglesey. The Earl of Anglesey died in 1710. Henrietta then married the 3rd Baron Ashburnham (later created Earl of Ashburnham) on 24 July 1714 and became Lady Ashburnham. They had one child, also called Lady Henrietta, who succeeded her mother as Baroness Strange.

The 4th Lady Strange died in 1718 and was buried at Ashburnham, East Sussex. Some years following her death, Parliamentary intervention was required to settle the ownership of the Bretherton estate which she had inherited.

References

Cokayne, George Edward, The Complete Peerage of England, Scotland, Ireland, Great Britain and the United Kingdom, Extant, Extinct or Dormant, A. Sutton, Gloucester, 1982. [orig. 13 volumes, published by The St. Catherine Press Ltd, London, England, from 1910 to 1959; reprinted in microprint: 13 vol. in 6, Gloucester: A. Sutton, 1982; volume XII/1, p. 338.
Burke's Peerage & Baronetage, 106th Edition, Charles Mosley, Burke's Peerage, Crans, Switzerland, 1999, p. 2726.

1687 births
1718 deaths
Anglesey, Henrietta Annesley, Countess of
Ashburnham
Hereditary women peers
Daughters of British earls
Henrietta
Henrietta
17th-century English nobility
18th-century English people
17th-century English women
18th-century English women
People of Byzantine descent
Barons Strange
People from Ashburnham, East Sussex